Systenita is a monotypic genus of Venezuelan cellar spiders containing the single species, Systenita prasina. It was first described by Eugène Louis Simon in 1893, and is only found in Venezuela.

See also
 List of Pholcidae species

References

Monotypic Araneomorphae genera
Pholcidae
Spiders of South America